Saint Denys River (French: Rivière Denys) is a river in Nunavik, Quebec, Canada.

Apart from local Inuit and Cree, Saint Denys River was first explored in 1888 by Albert Peter Low.

River is named after 3rd-century Christian martyr, the patron of Paris.

Bonaventure Enterprises Inc. is doing extensive drilling for K9 Uranium on the north shore of Saint Denys River (2008).

See also
Saint Denys River Expedition 2002

References

Rivers of Nord-du-Québec
Nunavik